Djet, also known as Wadj, Zet, and Uadji (in Greek possibly the pharaoh known as Uenephes or possibly Atothis), was the fourth pharaoh of the First Dynasty, successor of Djer. Djet's Horus name means "Horus Cobra" or "Serpent of Horus".

Family 

Djet's queen was his sister Merneith, who may have ruled as a pharaoh in her own right after his death. There is a possibility that a woman known as Ahaneith was also one of his wives. Djet and Merneith's son was Den, and their grandson was Anedjib.

Reign 

How long Djet ruled is unknown. Only one Seker festival is attested by ivory labels dating to his reign, whose duration is estimated to be anywhere between six and ten years. According to Wolfgang Helck he reigned 10 years. From a calendar entry, Djer is known to have died on 7 Peret III while Djet began his reign on 22 Peret IV. The reason for the 45 days of interregnum is unknown.

Details of Djet's reign are lost in the lacunas of the Palermo Stone. However, finds of vessel fragments and seal impressions prove that there were intense trading activities with Syria and Canaan at the time. Graves at Tarkhan and Saqqara dating to his reign yielded pottery from Canaan. Other activities can be inferred from the only two known years tablets of the ruler, one of which is preserved in two copies. The reading of the events described on the tablets is highly problematic. Helck translated: "Year of the planning of the underground/basement (?) of the dual plant, birth of lotus buds, standing in the crown shrine of the two Ladies." The other year tablet mentions a victory, the production (birth) of a statue and perhaps the creation of a fortress. Finally, in Marsa Alam in Nubia, the short inscription "Hemka" below "Djet" was discovered. 

Clay seals prove that the official Amka begun his career under king Djer, as manager of the "Hor-sekhenti-dju" estate. Under Djet, Amka became royal steward. In the early years of the king's successor Amka died after he was appointed to regional responsibilities in the western Nile Delta. Other senior officials under Djet were Sekhemkasedj and Setka.

Manetho mentions that in his reign a great famine seized Egypt. He also says that he erected pyramids near Kôchômê.

Tomb

Djet's tomb is located at Abydos in Petrie's Tomb Z. It is located west of his father, King Djer's tomb. Surrounding Djet's tomb are 174 subsidiary burials most of them being retainers that were sacrificed upon Djet's death to serve him in the afterlife. 
Found within Djet's tomb was a stele. This stele was a snake surmounted by a falcon (Horus) and could be interpreted to mean "Horus the snake". Also found within the tomb was an ivory comb with the name of Djet on it, along with a picture of the stele. Copper tools and pottery were also found in the tomb, a common find in Egyptian tombs. There is evidence that Djet's tomb was intentionally burned, along with other tombs at Abydos from this time period. The tombs were later renovated because of the association with the cult of Osiris.

Djet owes his fame to the survival, in well-preserved form, of one of his artistically refined tomb steles. It is carved in relief with Djet's Horus name, and shows that the distinct Egyptian style had already become fully developed at that time. This stela was discovered in 1904 by Émile Amélineau and is today on display at the Louvre museum. Another artistic landmark dated to Djet's reign is his ivory comb  now housed in the Egyptian Museum. It is the earliest surviving depiction of the heavens symbolised by the outspread wings of a falcon. The wings carry the bark of Seker, below the celestial bark Djet's serekh is surrounded by two Was scepters and one Ankh-sign.

See also 
 List of Pharaohs
 Ancient Egyptian retainer sacrifices

References

Bibliography
Toby A. H. Wilkinson, Early Dynastic Egypt, Routledge, London/New York 1999, 73-74 
Toby A. H. Wilkinson, Royal Annals of Ancient Egypt: The Palermo Stone and Its Associated Fragments, (Kegan Paul International), 2000.
 

30th-century BC Pharaohs
Pharaohs of the First Dynasty of Egypt
Djer